Maria Cristina Richaud is an Argentinian psychologist. She was born and raised up in Buenos Aires, and in 1970 received her bachelor's degree in psychology from University of Buenos Aires, and her doctorate in cognitive psychology from the same university 4 years later. Then she became a researcher at National Council of Scientific and Technological Research. Her work are mainly about parenting, stress, coping, attachment, and social cognitive variables in children and adolescents. Later she devoted herself to the study of children at risk from poverty.

Richaud served as the vice-president and then president of the Argentine Association of Behavioral Sciences. She co-founded Interdisciplinaria: Revista de Psicología y Ciencias Afines in 1980. She also served as the director of Interdisciplinary Center for Research in Mathematical and Experimental Psychology from 2003. In 2013 she and Fons van de Vijver received APA Award for Distinguished Contributions to the International Advancement of Psychology.

References

Year of birth missing (living people)
Living people
Argentine psychologists
Argentine women psychologists
University of Buenos Aires alumni
Academic staff of the University of Buenos Aires